

House of Normandy

House of Montfort-l'Amaury

House of Évreux

House of La Tour d'Auvergne

See also 
List of Navarrese consorts
Duchess of Bouillon

Sources 
NORMAN NOBILITY

 
Evreux